The Catholic Diocese of Castres, in Southern France, was created in 1317 from the diocese of Albi. It was suppressed at the time of  the French Revolution, under the Concordat of 1801. Its territory returned to the archdiocese of Albi.

The bishop of Castres had his see at Castres Cathedral.

Bishops
 5 August 1317 to 1327: Dieudonné I.
 1328–1338: Amelius de Lautrec
 1338–1353: Jean I. des Prés
 1353–1359: Etienne de Abavo
 1359–1364: Pierre I. de Bagna
 31 May 1364 to 1374: Raimond I. de Sainte-Gemme
 1375 to 30 May 1383: Elie de Donzenac
 8 October 1383 to 1386: Guy de Roye
 1386–1388: Dieudonné II.
 2 December 1388 to 27 May 1418: Jean II. Engeard
 1418–1421: Aimeric Noël
 1423–1427: 
 c. 1428: Jean III. Amardy
 c. 1430: Pierre II. de Cotigny
 1432 to 17. July 1448: Gérard Machet
 1449 to 6. August 1458: Maraud de Condom
 1460–1493: Jean IV. d'Armagnac
 1494 to 2. July 1509: Charles I. de Martigny
 1509: Jean V. de Martigny
 1509–1526: Pierre III. de Martigny
 1528–1530: Charles II. de Martigny
 1531–1535: Jacques de Tournon
 1535–1551: Antoine-Charles de Vesc
 1552–1583: Claude d'Auraison
 1583 to 13 May 1632: Jean VI. de Fossé
 13 May 1632 to 1654: Jean VII. de Fossé
 1657 to 1. Juli 1662: Charles-François d'Anglure de Bourlemont
 1664 to 16. April 1682: Michel Tubeuf
 3 July 1682 to 11. April 1705: Augustin de Maupeou
 11 April 1705 to 26. June 1736: Honoré de Quiqueran de Beaujeu
 1736 to 24 May 1752: François de Lastic de Saint-Jal
 1752–1773: Jean-Sébastien de Barral
 1773–1790: Jean-Marc de Royère

See also
 Catholic Church in France
 List of Catholic dioceses in France

References

Bibliography

Reference works
  (Use with caution; obsolete)
  (in Latin) 
 (in Latin)

Studies

 
Castres
Religious organizations established in the 1310s
Castres
1317 establishments in Europe
1310s establishments in France
1801 disestablishments in France